Vi äro musikanter is a Swedish folk song typically sung when dancing around the Christmas tree and the Midsummer pole. It was written down early in Folklekar från Västergötland (1908-1934), published by Sven Lampa. It is a so-called "mimic song", where the persons singing it can mimic playing the different musical instruments mentioned in the song lyrics.

Recordings
An early recording was done by Gösta Jonsson and Britt Berg, appearing in a medley of Christmas songs recorded in Berlin in September 1933, and released on a record later that year.

Publication
 Julens önskesångbok, 1997, under the lines "Tjugondag Knut dansar julen ut", credited as "folk game"
 Barnens svenska sångbok, 1999, under the lines "Sång med lek och dans".

See also
 The Music Man (song)

References

 Barnens svenska sångbok (1999)

Swedish-language songs
Year of song unknown